"The Crown of the Crusader Kings" is a 2001 Scrooge McDuck comic by Don Rosa.

The story was first published in the Danish Anders And & Co. #2001-43; the first American publication was in Uncle Scrooge #339, in March 2005.

Plot
To make up for the loss of the Crown of Genghis Khan, Scrooge McDuck and his nephews looks for its Western equivalent, the Crusader Kings' crown, sent to Cathay on Cristoforo Colombo's expedition in 1492 and still hidden in the Caribbean. 

To locate it, they first recover Colombo's logbook in a hut in the Arctic, left there by explorer Adolf Erik Nordenskiöld, and read that "the templar hid the crown". They visit the International Money Council (from Carl Barks' The Fabulous Philosopher's Stone) in Paris looking for additional clues, and Director Molay reveals to them that the Knights Templar, a crusader order which evolved into Europe's first bank network, ceded to the Kings of Spain and Portugal the crown to be sent to Cathay, in exchange of a share of the future trade, with the proviso that, should the voyage fail to reach its destination, the contract would become null and void by October 13, 1582, and the crown would be returned to the Order. It's also mentioned that the Templars, whose properties were seized by Philip IV of France, managed to spirit away their treasury in several locations, including Scotland.

Molay accompanies the Ducks to Haiti, but purposefully attempts to send them on a wild goose chase. When they nevertheless manage to locate the crown, he claims ownership of it, as the IMC was formerly the Bank of the Templar Order. The Ducks manage to prove that his claim is null and void because of the switch to the Gregorian calendar (executed by skipping ten days), which meant that there never was an October 13, 1582. Eventually, however, the government of Haiti is recognized as the rightful owner of the crown, and Scrooge is satisfied by keeping the fabric on which the crown was wrapped in, as it's the Clan McDuck tartan, indicating the Knights Templar's vast treasure is located at Castle McDuck.

The story continues in The Old Castle's Other Secret or A Letter From Home.

External links

Disney comics stories
Donald Duck comics by Don Rosa
2001 in comics
Comics set in Chicago
Arctic in fiction
Comics set in a fictional country
Comics set in the United States
Comics set in Paris
Comics set in Haiti
Comics set in the 1950s
Treasure hunt comics